The Merit Systems Protection Board (MSPB) is an independent quasi-judicial agency established in 1979 to protect federal merit systems against partisan political and other prohibited personnel practices and to ensure adequate protection for federal employees against abuses by agency management.

When an employee of most Executive Branch agencies is separated from his or her position, or suspended for more than 14 days, the employee can request that an employee of MSPB conduct a hearing into the matter by submitting an appeal, generally within 30 days. In that hearing, the agency will have to prove that the action was warranted and the employee will have the opportunity to present evidence that it was not. A decision of MSPB is binding unless set aside on appeal to federal court. Along with the Office of Personnel Management and the Federal Labor Relations Authority, the MSPB is a successor agency of the United States Civil Service Commission.

The board had gone without a quorum for the entire Trump administration, with the last member retiring at the end of February 2019.

Board quorum resumed on March 4, 2022 upon the swearing in of Raymond Limon and Tristan Leavitt.

Function
Generally, appeals are heard by the United States Court of Appeals for the Federal Circuit.  However, appeals involving claims of discrimination are heard in federal district court.

The Board carries out its statutory mission by:
Adjudicating employee appeals of personnel actions over which the Board has jurisdiction, such as removals, suspensions, furloughs, and demotions
Adjudicating appeals of administrative decisions affecting an individual's rights or benefits under the Civil Service Retirement System or the Federal Employees' Retirement System
Adjudicating employee complaints filed under the Whistleblower Protection Act, the Uniformed Services Employment and Reemployment Rights Act, and the Veterans Employment Opportunities Act
Adjudicating cases brought by the United States Office of Special Counsel (OSC), principally complaints of prohibited personnel practices and Hatch Act violations;
Adjudicating requests to review regulations of the Office of Personnel Management that are alleged to require or result in the commission of a prohibited personnel practice-or reviewing such regulations on the Board's own motion
Ordering compliance with final Board orders where appropriate
Conducting studies of the Federal civil service and other merit systems in the Executive Branch to determine whether they are free from prohibited personnel practices

Board members 

The Board is composed of three members, nominated by the President of the United States, with the advice and consent of the Senate, for a term of seven years. By statute 5 U.S.C. §§ 1201, "not more than 2 […] shall be adherents of the same political party". The chair of the board requires two separate Senate confirmations, one as a member of the board and one as chair. The President can designate a vice chair without Senate confirmation.

Significant appeals
The largest settlement since the inception of MSPB in 1979 was for $820,000 in Robert W. Whitmore v. Department of Labor. The Board approved the settlement on June 5, 2013. Whitmore was fired after giving Congressional testimony that the Occupational Safety and Health Administration's workplace injury and illness program was deliberately ineffective. Whitmore had worked for the Bureau of Labor Statistics for 37 years.

The largest settlement before Whitmore was for $755,000 to former Securities and Exchange Commission lawyer Gary J. Aguirre, for his wrongful termination in 2005. The SEC settled Aguirre's claim on June 29, 2009.

In January 2011, the Board ordered the US Park Police to reinstate its former chief, Teresa Chambers, who had been fired in July 2004 for speaking to the Washington Post about the consequences of Park Police staff shortages. The Board also found her entitled to retroactive pay dating back to July 2004 and legal costs.

Merit Principles survey

The Merit Systems Protection Board surveyed federal employees in 1992 and 2010. The response rate was 64 and 58 percent, netting approximately 13,000 and 42,000 responses in the 1992 and 2010 surveys, respectively. One question asked, "During the last 12 months, did you personally observe or obtain direct evidence of one or more illegal or wasteful activities involving your agency?"  In 1992, 17.7 percent of respondents answered yes. In 2010, only 11.1 percent of respondents answered yes.

In 1992, 53 percent of respondents who made a disclosure reported that they were identified as the source. In 2010, 43 percent reported that they were identified. In both 1992 and 2010, approximately one-third of the individuals who felt they had been identified as a source of a report of wrongdoing also perceived either threats or acts of reprisal, or both. To qualify for protection under the Whistleblower Protection Act, the individual must be disclosing a violation of a law, rule, or regulation; gross mismanagement; a gross waste of funds; an abuse of authority; or a substantial and specific danger to public health or safety. Only certain official personnel actions are prohibited; other forms of retaliation remain permissible.

Criticism
There are complaints that the MSPB has gone far beyond protecting civil servants from unjustified disciplinary action. Rather, critics allege, the MSPB now makes it nearly impossible to fire poor performers or problematic employees, even when they have committed egregious violations that would result in immediate termination in the private sector. According to the CEO of the Partnership for Public Service, "There is no question that taxpayers are losing hundreds of millions of dollars, in a conservative estimate. They are losing more than that because they are losing the ability to get the very best out of government."

However, statistics gathered by the MSPB state that in 2014, a total of 15,925 appeals were filed with the MSPB. Of those, 5,283 were dismissed, 1,093 were settled, and 9,549 were adjudicated by way of initial decisions made by MSPB administrative judges and administrative law judges. In those initial decisions, the MSPB affirmed the employing agency's decision 9,348 times (nearly 98% of the time), modified the employing agency's decision or mitigated the penalty imposed 21 times, and reversed the employing Agency's decision 169 times. The Presidentially-appointed Board members granted review of 170 initial decisions, remanding the case for further review in 112 cases, reversing the initial decisions of MSPB administrative judges and administrative law judges in 30 cases, affirming the initial decision in 18 cases, and taking another action in 10 cases.

From January 7, 2017 to March 3, 2022, the MSPB lacked a quorum consisting of two members. It is the longest the agency has been without a quorum in its history. Without a quorum, the "Board will be unable to issue decisions that require a majority vote" until more members are appointed by the president. Effectively, this meant that no new substantive decisions are being issued and the backlog of cases awaiting a final disposition is increasing. As of March 2019, the last member's term had expired and the Senate had not acted on President Trump's nominations. With a vacant board, its general counsel becomes the acting executive and administrative officer, and administrative judges still hear cases and issue initial decisions.

On March 4, 2022, President Biden's nominees Vice Chair Raymond Limon and Member Tristan Leavitt were sworn in to the MSPB, leading to the restoration of a quorum.

History
It was established as an independent agency by Reorganization Plan No. 2 of 1978, effective January 1, 1979, in accordance with EO 12107, December 28, 1978, and the Civil Service Reform Act of 1978, October 13, 1978.

See also
Title 5 of the Code of Federal Regulations
Douglas Factors
Whistleblower Protection Act

Notes

References

External links
 
 United States Merit Systems Protection Board in the Federal Register
 MSPB Case Statistics FY 2007-2010 and Annual Reports FY 1979-2010 (privately owned website)

 
1979 establishments in the United States
Courts and tribunals established in 1979